The Boulevard Soult is a boulevard in the Bel-Air neighborhood in the 12th arrondissement of Paris, France. It is one of the Boulevards of the Marshals that run in the outer parts of the city.

Description 

Boulevard Soult was accessible through the Petite Ceinture bus line. It can now be reached through the tramway Line 3 (Porte de Vincennes, Alexandra David-Néel, Montempoivre, Porte Dorée stations), the Métro Line 1 (Porte Dorée station), as well as RATP bus lines 29, 46, 56, 86 and 351.

History

The French war department had completed the Thiers wallincluding fortifications, a dry moat, a Rue Militaire and a large bermaround 1840. In 1859, the military engineering service gave conditional control to the Paris city council. The expansion of the land area of Paris in 1860, by annexing bordering communities, created a situation where everything within the Thiers wall was Paris and everything without was not. The Thiers wall, with its accompanying berm and moat, led to a profound disruption and complication of the synergistic relationship between Paris and its suburbs.

Paris city council started upgrading and conversion of some sections of the Rue Militaire into boulevards in 1861, with the (yet unnamed) Boulevard Soult one of the first stretches to open. In 1864, the boulevard was named after Jean-de-Dieu Soult (1769–1851), 1st Duke of Dalmatia and Marshal of France. Each section was named for a marshal of the First French Empire (1804–1814) who served under Napoleon I, leading to the entire ring being collectively called the Boulevards of the Marshals. The Boulevards of the Marshals concept was almost fully realized by 1932, though the final three sections, closing the ring, would not be completed until 2005. Of the 22 boulevards, 19 have been named for Soult or one of his fellow First Empire marshals.

In the 1930s, HBM-type social housings were built at La Zone to accommodate working-class people that have come through rural flight after WW1. On September 22, 2008, a fire killed a resident and devastated a building at No. 64 boulevard Soult at Porte de Saint-Mandé.

Since December 2012, a new section of the tramway Line 3 has been running on boulevard Soult.

Notable buildings and landmarks 
 At no. 27, there was a 16-meter-high and 2.20-meter-circumferential European nettle tree planted in 1906 and classified as a "remarkable tree". This tree no longer exists.
 In the mid-1960s, the southeastern section of boulevard Soult was altered to enable the construction of the lycée Paul Valéry, inaugurated in 1962 at No. 38.
 Square Émile-Cohl and square Georges-Méliès
 Access to the Promenade plantée at the level of rue du Sahel
 No. 101 : Access to Sentier des Merisiers, one of the narrowest streets of Paris, that leads to rue du Niger

References 

Boulevards in Paris
Streets in the 12th arrondissement of Paris
1860s establishments in France